The Men's 800 metres event  at the 2007 European Athletics Indoor Championships was held on March 2–4.

Medalists

Results

Heats
First 2 of each heat (Q) and the next 4 fastest (q) qualified for the semifinals.

Semifinals
First 3 of each semifinals qualified directly (Q) for the final.

Final

References
Results

800 metres at the European Athletics Indoor Championships
800